Charles Désiré Dupeuty (6 February 1798 – 20 October 1865), was a 19th-century French librettist and playwright.

Biography 
After he studied at the Lycée Impérial, he enrolled in the army during the Hundred Days then worked as an employee. He made his debut in the theatre in 1821, and in 1825 founded the opposition newspaper La nouveauté.

He is famous for being one of the founders of the Société des auteurs dramatiques of which he was vice-président for six years.

Many of his plays were performed on the most important Parisians stages of the 19th century: Théâtre des Folies-Dramatiques, Théâtre du Vaudeville, Théâtre du Palais-Royal, Théâtre de la Gaîté, Théâtre de la Porte-Saint-Martin, Théâtre des Variétés etc.

Adolphe Dupeuty was his son.

Works 

 La Fête au village, 1821
 L'Arracheur de dents, folie-parade in 1 act, mingled with couplets, with Villeneuve, 1822
 Fille et garçon, ou la Petite orpheline, comédie en vaudevilles in 1 act, with Villeneuve, 1822
 Le Premier prix, ou les Deux artistes, comédie en vaudevilles in 1 act, with Villeneuve, 1822
 L'Actrice, comédie en vaudevilles in 1 act, with Villeneuve, 1823
 Mon ami Christophe, comédie en vaudevilles in 1 act, with W. Lafontaine, 1823
 Le Sergent de Chevert, vaudeville historique in 1 act, with Villeneuve, 1823
 Les Acteurs à l'essai, comédie en vaudevilles épisodique in 1 act, with Ferdinand de Villeneuve, 1824
 Un jour à Dieppe, with Langlé, 1824
 La Petite somnambule, comédie en vaudevilles in 1 act, with Villeneuve, 1824
 Ourika ou la Négresse, drama in 1 act, with Villeneuve, 1824
 Les Modistes, tableau-vaudeville in 1 act, with Villeneuve and Charles-Gaspard Delestre-Poirson, 1824
 Le Oui des jeunes filles, comédie en vaudevilles in 1 act, with La Salle, 1824
 Le Tableau de Téniers, ou l'Artiste et l'ouvrier, vaudeville in 1 act, with Villeneuve and Maurice Alhoy, 1824
 Pierre et Marie, ou le Soldat ménétrier, comédie en vaudevilles in 1 act, with Langlé and Villeneuve, 1824
 Léonide, comédie vaudeville in 3 acts, with Amable de Saint-Hilaire and Villeneuve, 1824
 Alice, ou les Six promesses, vaudeville in 1 act, with Villeneuve and Amable de Saint-Hilaire, 1825
 Monsieur Charles, ou Une matinée à Bagatelle, comédie en vaudevilles in 1 act, 1825
 Les Deux tailleurs, ou la Fourniture et la façon, comédie en vaudevilles in 1 act, with La Salle and Villeneuve, 1825
 Nicaise, ou le Jour des noces, comédie en vaudevilles in 1 act, with Villeneuve, 1825
 L'Anonyme, comédie en vaudevilles in 2 acts, with Villeneuve and Armand-François Jouslin de La Salle, 1826
 La Dette d'honneur, comédie en vaudevilles in 2 acts, with Langlé and Villeneuve, 1826
 Le Soldat en retraite, ou les Coups du sort, drama in 2 acts, with La Salle and Villeneuve, 1826
 Le Vieux pauvre, ou le Bal et l'incendie, melodrama in 3 acts et à grand spectacle, with Laloue and Villeneuve, 1826
 Le hussard de Felsheim, comédie en vaudevilles in 3 acts, with Villeneuve, 1827
 Monsieur Botte, comédie en vaudevilles in 3 acts, with Villeneuve, 1827
 Le Jeune maire, comédie en vaudevilles in 2 acts, with Saintine and Duvert, 1827
 Le Palais, la guinguette et le champ de bataille, prologue d'inauguration en 3 tableaux, à grand spectacle, with Brazier and Carmouche, 1827
 La Revue au galop, vaudeville in 1 act and a show, with Alhoy and La Salle, 1827
 La grande duchesse, comédie en vaudevilles in 1 act, with Saintine and Villeneuve, 1828
 Guillaume Tell, drame-vaudeville in 3 acts, with Saintine, Villeneuve and Adolphe Adam, 1828
 Le Sergent Mathieu, comédie en vaudevilles in 3 acts, with Saintine, 1828
 Les enfants trouvés, comédie en vaudevilles in 2 acts, with Saintine and Duvert, 1828
 Le Cousin Giraud, comédie en vaudevilles in 1 act, with Ferdinand Laloue and Antoine Jean-Baptiste Simonnin, 1828
 Les poletais, comédie en vaudevilles en 2 parts, 1828
 Le page de Woodstock, with Saintine and Duvert, 1828
 Les Omnibus, ou la Revue en voiture, vaudeville in 4 tableaux, with de Courcy and Espérance Hippolyte Lassagne, 1828
 L'Art de se faire aimer de son mari, comédie en vaudevilles in 3 acts, with Saintine, 1828
 La revue de Paris, scènes épisodiques mingled with couplets, with Rougemont and Courcy, 1829
 L'Humoriste, vaudeville, with Fulgence de Bury, 1829
 Cricri et ses mitrons, with Pierre-Frédéric-Adolphe Carmouche and Armand-François Jouslin de La Salle, 1829
 Madame Grégoire ou Le cabaret de la Pomme de pin, 1830
 Napoléon ou Schoenbrunn et Sainte Hélène, drame historique in 2 parts and 9 tableaux, music by Louis Alexandre Piccinni, 1830
 L'espionne, épisode de 1808 in 5 parts, mêlé de chant, with Achille d'Artois, 1830
 N, I, Ni, ou le Danger des Castilles, amphigouri-romantique in 5 acts and in sublimes verses, mêlé de prose ridicule, with Carmouche, de Courcy, Victor Hugo and Piccini, 1830
 Tristine ou Chaillot, Surêne et Charenton, trilogie sans préambule et sans suite, with Courcy and Carmouche, 1830
 La famille improvisée, scènes épisodiques, with Nicolas Brazier and Duvert, 1831
 Angélique et Jeanneton, comédie en vaudevilles in 4 acts, with X.-B. Saintine, 1831
 Victorine ou la nuit porte conseil, drama in 5 acts, with Dumersan, 1831
 Marionnette, parody in 5 acts and in verses by Marion Delorme, with Duvert, 1831
 Le Maréchal Brune, ou la Terreur de 1815, événement historique in 4 tableaux, with Fontan, 1831
 Madame Grégoire ou Le Cabaret de la pomme de pin, song in 2 acts, with Rochefort and Charles de Livry, 1831
 La vie de Molière, historical comedy in 3 acts, with Étienne Arago, 1832
 L'homme de la nature et l'homme policé, vaudeville in 2 acts and 5 tableaux, with de Kock, 1832
 Le courrier de la malle, comedy in 3 acts, with Rougemont and Courcy, 1832
 Le Barbier du roi d'Aragon, drama in 3 acts, in prose, with Jean-Joseph Ader and Louis Marie Fontan, 1832
 Le Fils de l'Empereur, histoire contemporaine in 2 acts, with Théodore Cogniard and Fontan, 1832
 La Camargo ou L'opéra en 1750, comedy in 4 acts, mingled with song, with Fontan, 1833
 Bergami et la reine d'Angleterre, drama in 5 acts and 6 tableaux, with Maurice Alhoy and Fontan, 1833
 Le Gentilhomme, vaudeville anecdotique in 1 act, with de Courcy, 1833
 Faublas, comedy i act mingled with songs with Léon Lévy Brunswick and Victor Lhérie, 1833
 Le comte de Saint-Germain, play in 3 acts, mingled with songs, with Fontan, 1834
 La croix d'or, 1835
 Madelon-Friquet, comédie en vaudevilles in 2 acts, with Rougemont, 1835
 Analyse de Napoléon à Schoenbrunn et à Sainte-Hélène, with François Regnier de La Brière, 1835
 Jean Jean don Juan, parody in five plays, with Achille d'Artois and Michel-Nicolas Balisson de Rougemont, 1835
 Un de plus, comédie en vaudevilles in 3 acts, with Paul de Kock, 1835
 La croix d'or, comedy in 2 acts, with Rougemont, 1835
 Cornaro, tyran pas doux, translation in 4 acts and in verses of Angelo, tyran de Padoue, with Victor Hugo and Félix-Auguste Duvert, 1834
 Paris dans la comète, revue vaudeville en 1 act, with Étienne Arago and Rougemont, 1835
 Le Barbier du roi d'Aragon, drama in 3 acts, in prose, with Ader and Fontan, 1836
 Pierre le Rouge, comedy in 3 acts, with Benjamin Antier and Rougemont, 1836
 Mariana, comedy in 3 acts, with Fontan, 1836
 Madeleine, drame-vaudeville in 3 acts, with de Kock, 1836
 M. Dasnière ou la suite du Sourd, comédie parade in 1 act mingled with couplets, with Dumersan, 1836
 La liste des notables, comedy in two acts, mingled with couplets, with Alexis Decomberousse, 1836
 L'Homme à femmes, comédie en vaudevilles in 5 acts, with Courcy, 1836
 L'ange gardien, comedy in 3 acts, mingled with songs, with Paulin Deslandes, 1837
 La Folie Beaujon ou l'Enfant du mystère, vaudeville in 1 act, with Edmond Rochefort, 1837
 La chevalière d'Eon, comédie historique in two acts, mingled with couplets, 1837
 Les dames de la halle, comédie-anecdote in 2 acts, with Vanderburch, 1838
 Mademoiselle, comédie en vaudevilles in 2 acts, with Laurencin, 1838
 Le Procès du maréchal Ney, (1815), historical drama in 4 tableaux, with Fontan, 1838
 Anacréon, ou Enfant chéri des dames, comedy in 1 act mingled with couplets, with Frédéric de Courcy, 1838
 Arthur ou 16 ans après, drame vaudeville in 2 acts, with Fontan, 1838
 Le Pauvre idiot, ou le Souterrain d'Heilberg, drama in 5 acts and 8 tableaux, with Fontan, 1838
 Argentine, comedy in 2 acts, mingled with couplets, with Michel Delaporte and Gabriel de Lurieu, 1839
 Balochard ou Samedi, dimanche ou lundi, vaudeville in three acts, with Louis-Émile Vanderburch, 1839
 Les filles de l'enfer, vaudeville fantastique en 4 acts and six tableaux, with Charles Desnoyer, 1839
 L'Ange dans le monde et le diable à la maison, comedy in 3 acts, with de Courcy, 1839
 La belle Bourbonnaise, comédie en vaudevilles in two acts, with Michel-Nicolas Balisson de Rougemont and Ferdinand Langlé, 1839
 Mignonne, ou Une aventure de Bassompierre, comedy in 2 acts, mingled with songs, with de Courcy, 1839
 Les Floueurs, ou l'Exposition de la flibusterie frrrançaise, parade in 1 act, with Langlé, 1839
 Bonaventure, comédie en vaudevilles in 3 acts and 4 tableaux, with de Courcy, 1840
 La Correctionnelle, scènes épisodiques, with Maurice Alhoy et Rougemont, 1840
 Le grand duc, proverbe in 1 act, with Courcy, 1840
 Matelots et matelottes, tableau vaudeville in 1 act, with Dumersan, 1840
 Les amours de Psyché, 1841
 Le Perruquier de l'empereur, drama in 5 acts, 1841
 Deux dames au violon, pochade in 1 act, with Cormon, 1841
 Les amours de Psyché, pièce fantastique, mingled with song, in 3 acts and 10 tableaux, preceded by l'Olympe, prologue, with Michel Delaporte, 1841
 Le Père Trinquefort, vaudeville in 1 act, with Cormon, 1841
 La maîtresse de poste, comedy in 1 act, with de Courcy, 1841
 Lucrèce, comedy in 3 acts mingled with song, with Bourgeois, 1841
 Paris la nuit, drame populaire in 5 acts and 8 tableaux, with Cormon, 1842
 Gringalet, fils de famille, comédie-parade in three acts, with Dumersan, 1842
 Les Deux sœurs de charité, drama in 3 acts, mingled with song, 1842
 Les petits mystères de Paris, vaudeville in 3 acts and 6 tableaux, with Cormon, 1842
 Les Grisettes en Afrique, ou le Harem, play in 2 acts and 3 tableaux, mingled with vaudevilles, with Carmouche, 1842
 Les Chevau-légers de la Reine, comedy in 3 acts, mingled with song, with Bernard Lopez, 1842
 Comédiens et marionnettes, vaudeville in 2 acts, with Delaporte, 1842
 Les Buses-graves, parodie des Burgraves , in 3 acts and in verses, with Langlé, 1843
 Le trombone du régiment, comédie en vaudevilles in three acts, with Cormon and Saint-Amand, 1843
 Les Cuisines parisiennes, vaudeville populaire in 3 acts, with Cormon, 1843
 Une campagne à deux, comedy in 1 act, 1843
 Ravel en voyage, vaudeville in 1 act, with Varin, 1844
 Le Troubadour omnibus, folie-vaudeville in 1 act, with Langlé, 1844
 Le canal Saint-Martin, drama in 5 acts et 7 tableaux, with Eugène Cormon, 1845
 Riche d'amour, comédie en vaudevilles in 1 act, with Duvert, Saintine and Augustin-Théodore de Lauzanne de Vauroussel, 1845
 Le lait d'ânesse, comédie en vaudevilles in 1 act, with de Lurieu, 1846
 La planète à Paris, revue of 1846 in 3 acts, with Duvert and Lurieu, 1846
 Les brodeuses de la Reine, comédie en vaudevilles in 1 act, with Gabriel de Lurieu, 1846
 La Veuve de quinze ans, comédie en vaudevilles in 1 act, 1846
 La Descente de la Courtille, vaudeville-ballet-pantomime in 2 tableaux, with Théophile Marion Dumersan, 1846
 Le chevalier d'Essonne, comédie en vaudevilles in 3 acts, with Auguste Anicet-Bourgeois, 1847
 Le Moulin à paroles, comédie en vaudevilles in 1 act, with de Lurieu, 1847
 Les Trois portiers, comédie en vaudevilles in 2 acts, with Vanderburch, 1847
 Fualdès, drama in five acts and eight tableaux, with  Eugène Grangé, 1848
 Le Buveur d'eau, tableau populaire in 1 act, with Paulin Deslandes, 1848
 Le chevalier Muscadin, comédie en vaudevilles in 2 acts, with Auguste Anicet-Bourgeois, 1849
 L'hôtel de la tête noire, drama in 5 acts and 9 tableaux, with Cormon and Grangé, 1849
 Le prophète, with Eugène Grangé, 1849
 Gracioso, ou le Père embarrassant, vaudeville in 3 acts, with Grangé, 1849
 L'hurluberlu, comedy in 1 act, with de Courcy, 1849
 La Vie de café, play in 3 acts, mingled with songs, with Vanderburch, 1850
 Les aventures de Suzanne, drama in five acts and eight tableaux, with Eugène Guinot, 1851
 Meublé et non meublé, vaudeville in 1 act, with Grangé, 1851
 L'Eau de javelle, comédie en vaudevilles in 1 act, with Lurieu, 1852
 Un frère terrible, comédie en vaudevilles in 1 act, with Guinot, 1852
 Un vieux de la vieille roche, comédie en vaudevilles in 1 act, with Grangé, 1852
 La poissarde, ou Les Halles en 1804, drama in five acts, with Ernest Bourget and Deslandes, 1852
 Hamlet, prince de Danemark, with Lurieu, 1853
 La Faridondaine, drama mingled with songs and new music, in five acts and huit tableaux, with Bourget, 1853
 La Chine à Paris, 1854
 Quatorze de dames, comédie en vaudevilles in 1 act, 1854
 Les gueux de Béranger, drama in five acts, mêlé de chant, with Jules Moinaux, 1855
 La Treille du Roi, opéra comique in 1 act, music by Paul Henrion, 1855
 Pilbox et Friquet, à-propos in 1 act, mêlé de chant, with Bourget, 1855
 Tromb-al-ca-zar, ou Les criminels dramatiques, bouffonnerie musicale in 1 act, with Bourget and Jacques Offenbach, 1856
 Les deux pêcheurs, 1857
 Le père aux écus, drama in 5 acts, with Ferdinand Dugué, 1857
 Le marquis d'Argentcourt, comédie en vaudevilles in 3 acts, with Delaporte and Clairville, 1857
 Une tempête dans une baignoire, one-act play, with de Lurieu, 1859
 Fanfan le batonniste, comédie en vaudevilles in 2 acts, with de Lurieu, 1859
 Le paratonnerre, comédie en vaudevilles in two acts, with Lurieu, 1860
 P'tit fils p'tit mignon, vaudeville en 1 act, with de Lurieu, 1860
 Le Maréchal Ney, drame historique in five acts and onze tableaux, with Auguste Anicet-Bourgeois and Adolphe d'Ennery, 1863
 Le carnaval des canotiers, vaudeville in 4 acts, with Henri Thiéry and Amédée de Jallais, 1864
 Les carrières de Montmartre, mélodrame populaire in 5 acts, 8 tableaux and a prologue, with Bourget, 1865
 La poissarde ou Les halles en 1804, 1868
 La Permission de minuit, tableau militaire, with Moinaux, 1868
 Ce que j'éprouve loin de Vous, romance, undated
 Si j'étais petit papier, Rondoletto, undated
 La Rose d'amour, Romance, undated

Bibliography 
 Gustave Vapereau, Dictionnaire universel des contemporains, Vol.1, 1870, (p. 592) 
 Louis Bethléem, Les Pièces de théâtre, 1924, (p. 171)

French opera librettists
19th-century French dramatists and playwrights
Writers from Paris
1798 births
1865 deaths